A neurological disorder is any disorder of the nervous system. Structural, biochemical or electrical abnormalities in the brain, spinal cord or other nerves can result in a range of symptoms. Examples of symptoms include paralysis, muscle weakness, poor coordination, loss of sensation, seizures, confusion, pain and altered levels of consciousness. There are many recognized neurological disorders, some relatively common, but many rare. They may be assessed by neurological examination, and studied and treated within the specialities of neurology and clinical neuropsychology.

Interventions for neurological disorders include preventive measures, lifestyle changes, physiotherapy or other therapy, neurorehabilitation, pain management, medication, operations performed by neurosurgeons or a specific diet. The World Health Organization estimated in 2006 that neurological disorders and their sequelae (direct consequences) affect as many as one billion people worldwide, and identified health inequalities and social stigma/discrimination as major factors contributing to the associated disability and their impact.

Causes
 Although the brain and spinal cord are surrounded by tough membranes, enclosed in the bones of the skull and spinal vertebrae, and chemically isolated by the blood–brain barrier, they are very susceptible if compromised. Nerves tend to lie deep under the skin but can still become exposed to damage. Individual neurons, the neural circuits, and nerves into which they form are susceptible to electrochemical and structural disruption. Neuroregeneration may occur in the peripheral nervous system and thus overcome or work around injuries to some extents, but it is thought to be rare in the brain and spinal cord.

The specific causes of neurological problems vary, but can include genetic disorders, congenital abnormalities or disorders, infections, lifestyle or environmental health problems including malnutrition, brain damage, spinal cord injury, nerve injury or gluten sensitivity (with or without intestinal damage or digestive symptoms). Metal poisoning, where metals accumulate in the human body and disrupt biological processes, has been reported to induce neurological problems, at least in the case of lead. The neurological problem may start in another body system that interacts with the nervous system. For example, cerebrovascular disease involves brain injury due to problems with the blood vessels (cardiovascular system) supplying the brain; autoimmune disorders involve damage caused by the body's own immune system; lysosomal storage diseases such as Niemann–Pick disease can lead to neurological deterioration. The National Institute for Health and Care Excellence recommends considering the evaluation of an underlying coeliac disease in people with unexplained neurological symptoms, particularly peripheral neuropathy or ataxia.

In a substantial minority of cases of neurological symptoms, no neural cause can be identified using current testing procedures, and such "idiopathic" conditions can invite different theories about what is occurring. Generally speaking, a substantial number of neurological disorders may have originated from a previous clinically not recognized viral infection. For example, it is thought that infection with the Hepatitis E virus, which is often initially asymptomatic may provoke neurological disorders, but there are many other examples as well.

Numerous examples have been described of neurological disorders that are associated with mutated DNA repair genes (for reviews see). Inadequate repair of DNA damages can lead directly to cell death and neuron depletion as well as disruptions in the pattern of epigenetic alterations required for normal neuronal function.

Classification

Neurological disorders can be categorized according to the primary location affected, the primary type of dysfunction involved, or the primary type of cause. The broadest division is between central nervous system disorders and peripheral nervous system disorders. The Merck Manual lists brain, spinal cord and nerve disorders in the following overlapping categories:

 Brain:
 Brain damage according to cerebral lobe (see also 'lower' brain areas such as basal ganglia, cerebellum, brainstem):
 Frontal lobe damage
 Parietal lobe damage
 Temporal lobe damage
 Occipital lobe damage
 Brain dysfunction according to type:
 Aphasia (language)
 Dysgraphia (writing)
 Dysarthria (speech)
 Apraxia (patterns or sequences of movements)
 Agnosia (identifying things or people)
 Amnesia (memory)
 Spinal cord disorders (see spinal pathology, injury, inflammation)
 Peripheral neuropathy and other Peripheral nervous system disorders
 Cranial nerve disorder such as Trigeminal neuralgia
 Autonomic nervous system disorders such as dysautonomia, multiple system atrophy
 Seizure disorders such as epilepsy
 Movement disorders of the central and peripheral nervous system such as Parkinson's disease, essential tremor, amyotrophic lateral sclerosis, Tourette's syndrome, multiple sclerosis and various types of peripheral neuropathy
 Sleep disorders such as narcolepsy
 Migraines and other types of headache such as cluster headache and tension headache
 Lower back and neck pain (see back pain)
 Central neuropathy (see neuropathic pain)
 Neuropsychiatric illnesses (diseases and/or disorders with psychiatric features associated with known nervous system injury, underdevelopment, biochemical, anatomical, or electrical malfunction, and/or disease pathology e.g. attention deficit hyperactivity disorder, autism, Asperger syndrome, Tourette's syndrome and some cases of obsessive compulsive disorder as well as the neurobehavioral associated symptoms of degeneratives of the nervous system such as Parkinson's disease, essential tremor, Huntington's disease, Alzheimer's disease, multiple sclerosis and organic psychosis.)

Many of the diseases and disorders listed above have neurosurgical treatments available (e.g. Tourette's syndrome, Parkinson's disease, essential tremor and obsessive compulsive disorder).
 Delirium and dementia such as Alzheimer's disease
 Dizziness and vertigo
 Stupor and coma
 Head injury
 Stroke (CVA, cerebrovascular attack)
 Tumors of the nervous system (e.g. cancer)
 Multiple sclerosis and other demyelinating diseases
 Infections of the brain or spinal cord (including meningitis)
 Prion diseases (a type of infectious agent)
 Complex regional pain syndrome (a chronic pain condition)
Neurological disorders in non-human animals are treated by veterinarians.

Mental functioning
A neurological examination can, to some extent, assess the impact of neurological damage and disease on brain function in terms of behavior, memory or cognition. Behavioral neurology specializes in this area. In addition, clinical neuropsychology uses neuropsychological assessment to precisely identify and track problems in mental functioning, usually after some sort of brain injury or neurological impairment.

Alternatively, a condition might first be detected through the presence of abnormalities in mental functioning, and further assessment may indicate an underlying neurological disorder. There are sometimes unclear boundaries in the distinction between disorders treated within neurology, and mental disorders treated within the other medical specialty of psychiatry, or other mental health professions such as clinical psychology. In practice, cases may present as one type but be assessed as more appropriate to the other. Neuropsychiatry deals with mental disorders arising from specific identified diseases of the nervous system.

One area that can be contested is in cases of idiopathic neurological symptoms - conditions where the cause cannot be established. It can be decided in some cases, perhaps by exclusion of any accepted diagnosis, that higher-level brain/mental activity is causing symptoms, rather than the symptoms originating in the area of the nervous system from which they may appear to originate. Classic examples are "functional" seizures, sensory numbness, "functional" limb weakness and functional neurological deficit ("functional" in this context is usually contrasted with the old term "organic disease"). Such cases may be contentiously interpreted as being "psychological" rather than "neurological". Some cases may be classified as mental disorders, for example as conversion disorder, if the symptoms appear to be causally linked to emotional states or responses to social stress or social contexts.

On the other hand, dissociation refers to partial or complete disruption of the integration of a person's conscious functioning, such that a person may feel detached from one's emotions, body and/or immediate surroundings. At one extreme this may be diagnosed as depersonalization disorder. There are also conditions viewed as neurological where a person appears to consciously register neurological stimuli that cannot possibly be coming from the part of the nervous system to which they would normally be attributed, such as phantom pain or synesthesia, or where limbs act without conscious direction, as in alien hand syndrome. Theories and assumptions about consciousness, free will, moral responsibility and social stigma can play a part in this, whether from the perspective of the clinician or the patient.

Conditions that are classed as mental disorders, or learning disabilities and forms of intellectual disability, are not themselves usually dealt with as neurological disorders. Biological psychiatry seeks to understand mental disorders in terms of their basis in the nervous system, however. In clinical practice, mental disorders are usually indicated by a mental state examination, or other type of structured interview or questionnaire process. At the present time, neuroimaging (brain scans) alone cannot accurately diagnose a mental disorder or tell the risk of developing one; however, it can be used to rule out other medical conditions such as a brain tumor. In research, neuroimaging and other neurological tests can show correlations between reported and observed mental difficulties and certain aspects of neural function or differences in brain structure. In general, numerous fields intersect to try to understand the basic processes involved in mental functioning, many of which are brought together in cognitive science. The distinction between neurological and mental disorders can be a matter of some debate, either in regard to specific facts about the cause of a condition or in regard to the general understanding of brain and mind.

Moreover, the definition of disorder in medicine or psychology is sometimes contested in terms of what is considered abnormal, dysfunctional, harmful or unnatural in neurological, evolutionary, psychometric or social terms.

See also

 Central nervous system
 European Brain Council
 Human brain
 Mental disorder
 Neuroplasticity
 Peripheral nervous system
 Proctalgia fugax
 Hypokalemic sensory overstimulation

References

External links 

 Disorder Index of the National Institute of Neurological Disorders and Stroke